Bagrationovsky (masculine), Bagrationovskaya (feminine), or Bagrationovskoye (neuter) may refer to:
Bagrationovsky District, a district of Kaliningrad Oblast, Russia
Bagrationovskoye Urban Settlement, a municipal formation which the town of district significance of Bagrationovsk in Bagrationovsky District of Kaliningrad Oblast, Russia is incorporated as
Bagrationovskaya, a station of the Moscow Metro, Moscow, Russia